NGQ or ngq may refer to:

 NGQ, the IATA code for Ngari Gunsa Airport, Ngari Prefecture, Tibet, China
 ngq, the ISO 639-3 code for Ngoreme language, Tanzania
 ngq, a voiced nasal click in the Xhosa, Zulu, Hadza, and Northern Ndebele languages of southern Africa
 Bantang Station, a train station in Xiangtan, China on the Changsha–Zhuzhou–Xiangtan intercity railway
 Acropimpla, a genus of parasitoid wasps, by Catalogue of Life identifier
 Nangang District, Harbin, a district of Harbin, China; see List of administrative divisions of Heilongjiang